Tadakatsu (written 忠勝 or 忠毅) is a Japanese masculine given name. Notable people with the name include:

, Japanese samurai and daimyō
, Japanese daimyō
, Japanese samurai
, Japanese daimyō
, Japanese official and daimyō
, Japanese samurai and politician

Japanese masculine given names